Classe Operaia (Italian: Working Class) was a Marxist monthly magazine which was published in Italy for three years between 1964 and 1967. Its subtitle was "political monthly of the workers in struggle."

History and profile
Classe Operaia was founded by a group of Marxist intellectuals who left another Marxist magazine entitled Quaderni Rossi. The first issue of Classe Operaia came out in January 1964. Asor Rosa and Mario Tronti co-edited the magazine from its start in 1964 to 1966. One of the contributors was philosopher Antonio Negri. 

Target audience of Classe Operaia was the workers. The magazine's debut editorial, "Lenin in Inghilterra" (Italian: "Lenin in England"), by Mario Tronti emphasized the need to change the Marxist tradition which included the modification the dominant perspective of the period. Such a change was reported to be related to first the working class and its struggles and to the capital and its development. The last issue of the magazine appeared in March 1967.

References

1964 establishments in Italy
1967 disestablishments in Italy
Defunct political magazines published in Italy
Italian-language magazines
Magazines established in 1964
Magazines disestablished in 1967
Marxist magazines
Monthly magazines published in Italy